The sack of Baltimore took place on 20 June 1631, when the village of Baltimore in West Cork, Ireland, was attacked by pirates from the Barbary Coast of North Africa – Dutchmen, Algerians, and Ottoman Turks. The attack was the largest by Barbary slave traders on Ireland.

The attack was led by a Dutch captain, Jan Janszoon van Haarlem, also known as Murad Reis the Younger, who was enslaved by Algerians but released when he renounced his faith. Murad's force was led to the village by a man called Hackett, the captain of a fishing boat he had captured earlier, in exchange for his freedom. Hackett was subsequently hanged from the clifftop outside the village for conspiracy.

Attack

Murad's crew, made up of Algerians, launched their covert attack on the remote village on 20 June 1631. They captured 107 villagers, mostly English settlers along with some local Irish people (some reports put the number as high as 237). The attack was focused on the area of the village known to this day as the Cove. The villagers were put in irons and taken to a life of slavery in Algiers.

Aftermath 
Some prisoners were destined to live out their days as galley slaves, rowing for decades without ever setting foot on shore while others would spend long years in harem or as labourers. At most three of them ever returned to Ireland. One was ransomed almost at once and two others in 1646.

In the aftermath of the raid, the remaining villagers moved to Skibbereen, and Baltimore was virtually deserted for generations.

Conspiracy theories

There are conspiracy theories relating to the raid. It has been suggested that Sir Walter Coppinger, a prominent Catholic lawyer and member of the leading Cork family, who had become the dominant power in the area after the death of Sir Thomas Crooke, 1st Baronet, the founder of the English colony, orchestrated the raid to gain control of the village from the local Gaelic chieftain, Sir Fineen O'Driscoll. It was O'Driscoll who had licensed the lucrative pilchard fishery in Baltimore to the English settlers. Suspicion also points to O'Driscoll's exiled relatives, who had fled to Spain after the Battle of Kinsale, and had no hope of inheriting Baltimore by legal means. On the other hand, Murad may have planned the raid without any help; it is known that the authorities had advanced intelligence of a planned raid on the Cork coast, although Kinsale was thought to be a more likely target than Baltimore.

In popular culture
 The incident inspired Thomas Davis to write his poem, "The Sack of Baltimore." Evidently, Davis thought that the enslaved were O'Driscolls rather than planters who displaced them: "And when to die a death of fire that noble maid they bore, She only smiled, O'Driscoll's child; she thought of Baltimore."
 A detailed account of the sack of Baltimore can be found in the book The Stolen Village: Baltimore and the Barbary Pirates by Des Ekin.
 In 1999, the raid on Baltimore was portrayed in a screenplay titled Roaring Water, The Sack of Baltimore, by Irish screenwriter Sean Boyle.
 In 2014, Chris Bolister set the saga to music in "The Ballad (Sack) of Baltimore," written from the perspective of the captured James Rooney.
 In 2015, the raid inspired the song "Roaring Waters" from the album Last of Our Kind by British hard rock band The Darkness. The band were inspired to write the song after hearing of the incident while on Valentia Island, approximately 50 miles from Baltimore.
 In 2018, singer/songwriter Tim O'Riordan commemorated the raid in the song Sail Away To Barbary on the album Taibhse.
 A historic drama in three acts about the events leading up to and following the infamous raid in June 1631 set in 'The Cove', Baltimore, and at Lismore Castle. We Who Are Blameless by Rupert Stutchbury.
 A historical fiction novel regarding the Sack of Baltimore in three books: Baltimore, Baltimore Book 2, and Baltimore Book 3 by Tony Bryan.
 A musical soundtrack demonstration of a working historical fiction musical inspired by 'The Sack of Baltimore 1631,' called The Sack 1631, Music, Book, and Lyrics by Donnie Chauncey. The Sack 1631 - New Musical - Donnie Chauncey

See also
 Slavery in Africa
 Turkish Abductions, a similar raid on Iceland

References

External links
The Sack of Baltimore — short account from the Baltimore Web site
 The Sack of Baltimore — the text of Davis's poem
Fineen the Rover, Hackett and the Algerian pirates

Baltimore, County Cork
Conflicts in 1631
1631 in Ireland
Baltimore
Barbary pirates
Looting in Europe
Barbary slave trade
Acts of piracy
Slavery in Algeria